Dormeuil is a French textile company  founded in 1842  by 22-year-old Jules Dormeuil.

History
Dormeuil began with importing English fabrics to France. By 1862 its headquarters were established at 4 rue Vivienne in Paris. The first shop outside France was located at 10 New Burlington Street  in London. 

Dominic Dormeuil is the current President.

Locations
Monobrand stores are located in Paris, Neuilly sur Seine, Bordeaux, Strasbourg and Minato-ku, Tokyo.

See also
Loro Piana
Holland & Sherry
Ermenegildo Zegna
Vitale Barberis Canonico
Scabal

References

Textile companies of France
Manufacturing companies established in 1842
French companies established in 1842